Parma is a city in northern Italy.

Parma may also refer to:

Terms related to Parma, Italy 
 History
 The Duchy of Parma, a feudal name for the principality around Parma
 Alessandro Farnese, Duke of Parma and Piacenza, Governor of the Spanish Netherlands from 1578 to 1592
 49 Infantry Division Parma an Italian infantry division of World War II

 Food
 Parma ham, a name for 'Prosciutto', a type of Italian dry-cured ham
 Parmigiana, an Italian food dish
 Parmesan, an Italian hard cheese

 other
 Parma River, which divides the city and is a tributary of the Po river
 Parma Calcio 1913, the football (soccer) team from Parma
 The Charterhouse of Parma, a French 1839 novel by Stendhal set primarily in Parma

Places and jurisdictions elsewhere 
 in the United States
 Parma, Idaho
 Parma Township, Michigan
Parma, Michigan in Parma Township, Michigan
 Parma, Missouri
 Parma, New York
 Parma, Ohio
 Parma of the Ruthenians, a Midwest suffragan eparchy (diocese) of the Ruthenenian Catholic Archeparchy of Pittsburgh
 Parma Heights, Ohio
 Parma Senior High School, a public high school in Parma, Ohio

 in Europe (except Italy)
 Parma, Łódź Voivodeship (central Poland)
 Parma, Russia, several inhabited localities in Russia

in Asia 
 Parma, Tibet
 Parma, a yayla and hamlet in Çaykara district of Trabzon.
Parma Valley, Ladakh

People 
 Bruno Parma, a Slovene chess Grandmaster
 Jiří Parma, Czech ski jumper

Other uses 
 Parma (barque), a sailing ship built in 1902 and scrapped in 1938
 Parma (shield), a Roman shield
 Parma (fish), a genus of fish
 Parma, a letter of the Tengwar alphabet
 Parma wallaby, a macropod
 Parma, a planet from the Phantasy Star series mythos
 Typhoon Parma, a name used for two northwestern Pacific Ocean tropical cyclones
 Parma Violets, a British confectionery

See also 
 Parmigiano (disambiguation)
 Parmo